Carme Figueras i Siñol (Molins de Rei - July 12, 1955)  is a Spanish politician who was Minister of Social Welfare and Family Affairs in 2006.

References

1955 births
Living people
Socialists' Party of Catalonia politicians
Social affairs ministers of Catalonia